Diego Columbus (1479/1480 – February 23, 1526) was a navigator and explorer under the Kings of Castile and Aragón. He served as the 2nd Admiral of the Indies, 2nd Viceroy of the Indies and 4th Governor of the Indies as a vassal to the Kings of Castile and Aragón. He was the eldest son of Christopher Columbus and his wife Filipa Moniz Perestrelo.

He was born in Portugal, either in Porto Santo in 1479/1480, or in Lisbon in 1474. He spent most of his adult life trying to regain the titles and privileges granted to his father for his explorations and then denied in 1500. He was greatly aided in this goal by his marriage to María de Toledo y Rojas, niece of the 2nd Duke of Alba, who was the cousin of King Ferdinand.

Early life

Diego was made a page at the Spanish court in 1492, the year his father embarked on his first voyage. Diego had a younger half-brother, Fernando, by Beatriz Enríquez de Arana.  

Diego Columbus was taught by Christopher Columbus's second wife, Beatrice De Arana, until he transferred to the Franciscan monastery of La Rabida, at the urging of Father Juan Perez and friar Horacio Crassocius, prominent Franciscans and occasional priests to his father. 

Ferdinand and Diego had been pages to Prince Don Juan, then became pages to Queen Isabella in 1497.

Viceroy of the Indies

In August 1508, he was named Governor of the Indies, the post his father had held, arriving to Santo Domingo in July 1509. He established his home (the Alcázar de Colón), which still stands in Santo Domingo, in what is now the Dominican Republic. In 1511 as Viceroy of the Indies, Diego Columbus commissioned Diego Velázquez de Cuéllar to go on an expedition from Santo Domingo to the newly acquired Spanish island of Cuba.

According to Floyd, Diego "...was accompanied by a splendid entourage: his wife, Doña Maria, the first gran dama of the New World, the Duke of Alba's niece, with her own suite of doncellas; and his immediate relatives - Fernando his half-brother, his two uncles, Diego and Bartolomé, and his cousins, Andrea and Giovanni. Also on the expedition were his criados and his father's old retainers: Marcos de Aguilar, his forthright alcalde mayor, Diego Mendez, his business manager, and Gerónimo de Agüero, his former tutor. Other loyal Colombistas met him at Santo Domingo - his uncle by marriage, Francisco de Garay, whom he named alguacil mayor, and Bartolomé's criados, Miguel Díaz, Diego Velázquez, and Juan Cerón. His coming represented the permanent establishment of the most titled and notable family in the islands, at least for many years."

In 1511, a royal council declared Hispaniola, Puerto Rico, Jamaica and Cuba under Diego's power "by right of his father." However, Uraba and Veragua were deemed excluded, since the council regarded them as being discovered by Rodrigo de Bastidas. The council further confirmed Diego's titles of Viceroy and admiral were hereditary, though honorific. Furthermore, Diego had the right to one-tenth of the net royal income.  However, factions soon formed between those loyal to Diego and Ferdinand's royal officials. Matters deteriorated to the point that Ferdinand recalled Diego in 1514. Diego then spent the next five years in Spain "futilely pressing his claims."  Finally, in 1520, Diego's powers were restored by Charles.

Diego returned to Santo Domingo on 12 November 1520 in the midst of a native revolt against Spanish rule in the area of the Franciscan missions on the Cumana River, which was the site of Spanish slave raids, alongside the salt and pearl trades. Diego sent Gonzalo de Ocampo on a punitive expedition with 200 men and 6 ships. Then in 1521, Diego invested in Bartolomé de las Casas' enterprise to settle the Cumana area. That failure, blamed on Diego, meant the loss of the king's confidence. That loss, plus Diego's defiance of royal power on Cuba, forced Charles to reprimand Diego in 1523 and recall him back to Spain.

The first major slave rebellion in the Americas occurred in Santo Domingo on 26  December 1522, when enslaved Jolof laborers working on Diego's sugar plantation started a revolt. During the rebellion, many formerly enslaved insurgents managed to escape into the mountainous interior of the colony, where they established independent maroon communities amongst the surviving Taíno. However, a lot of rebels were captured, and the Admiral had them hanged.

Death and legacy
After his death, a compromise was reached in 1536 in which his son, Luis Colón de Toledo, was named Admiral of the Indies and renounced all other rights for a perpetual annuity of 10,000 ducats, the island of Jamaica as a fief, an estate of 25 square leagues on the Isthmus of Panama, then called Veragua, and the titles of Duke of Veragua and Marquess of Jamaica.

After Columbus's death on February 23, 1526, in Spain, the rents, offices and titles in the New World went into dispute by his descendants.

Marriage and children
He initially planned to marry Mencia de Guzman, daughter of the Duke of Medina Sidonia., but he was forced by King Fernando to marry the king's cousin María de Toledo y Rojas (c. 1490 – May 11, 1549), who secured the transportation and burial of her father-in-law, Christopher Columbus, in Santo Domingo. She was the daughter of Fernando Alvarez de Toledo, 1st Lord of Villoria, son of García Álvarez de Toledo, 1st Duke of Alba, and his first wife María de Rojas, and had the following children: 
 María Colón de Toledo (c. 1510 –), married to Sancho Folch de Cardona, 1st Marquess of Guadalest
 Luis Colón, 1st Duke of Veragua
 Cristóbal Colón de Toledo (c. 1510 – 1571), married firstly to María Leonor Lerma de Zuazo, without issue; married secondly to Ana de Pravia, and had one son (Diego Colon y Pravia [c. 1551 - Jan 27, 1578]) and one daughter (Francisca Colon y Pravia, [c. 1552 - April 1616]; and married thirdly to María Magadalena de Guzmán y Anaya, and had:
 Diego Colón de Toledo, father of Diego the 4th Admiral of the Indies.
 Francisca Colón de Toledo y Pravia (c. 1550 – April, 1616), married Diego de Ortegón (c. 1550 –), and had four children: Guiomar de Ortegon y Colon [d. 1621]; Jacoba de Oretgon y Colon [d. 1618]; Ana de Ortegon y Colon; and Josefa de Ortegon y Colon
 María Colón de Toledo y Guzmán (c. 1550 –), married to Luis de Avila, and had:
 Cristóbal de Avila y Colón (1579 –), unmarried and without issue
 Luis de Avila y Colón (1582-1633), married Maria de Rojas-Guzman Grajeda, without issue; married secondly to Francisca de Sandoval and had one son Cristobal
 Juan Colón Dávila ( - 1622), married Leonor Luyando y Manuel and had three sons.
 Bernardino Dávila y Colón ( - 1633)
 Maria de Avila y Colón (1592-), married Alonso de Guzman Grajeda and had one daughter (Mayor de Grajeda y Avila [c.1611-])
 Magdalena Dávila Colón (1592-1621)
 María Dávila Colón (1596 -)
 Juana Colón de Toledo (died c. 1592), married her cousin Luis de La Cueva y Toledo; their only child was María Colón de la Cueva (c. 1548-c.1600) who claimed the duchy of Veragua and died in New Spain (México).
 Isabel Colón de Toledo (c. 1515 –), married Dom Jorge Alberto de Portugal y Melo (1470 –), 1st Count of Gelves (who married secondly; his 1st marriage to Dona Guiomar de Ataíde remained childless), son of Dom Álvaro de Bragança, Lord of Tentúgal, Póvoa, Buarcos and Cadaval and Chancellor-Major of the Realm of Portugal. Their grandson, D. Nuno Álvares Pereira Colón y Portugal, Duke of Veragua and Admiral of the Indies became regent of the Kingdom of Portugal from 1621 until his death.

See also
 List of Viceroys of New Spain
 Viceroyalty of New Spain

References

External links
 

|-

|-

15th-century births
1526 deaths
Diego
Spanish explorers
Spanish viceroys
Spanish slave owners
Spanish nobility
Dukes of Veragua
Portuguese navigators
Colonial governors of Santo Domingo
People of the Colony of Santo Domingo
History of Hispaniola
Dominican Republic people of Spanish descent
Dominican Republic people of Italian descent
Dominican Republic people of Portuguese descent
16th-century Spanish people
16th-century Dominican Republic people
Spanish people of Italian descent
Portuguese people of Italian descent
Spanish West Indies